Coralliophila porphyroleuca is a species of sea snail, a marine gastropod mollusk, in the family Muricidae, the murex snails or rock snails.

Description
The shell attains a length of 21.6 mm.

Distribution
This species occurs in Tuamotu Islands. and off Tahiti.

References

 Crosse, H., 1870. Diagnoses molluscorum novorum. Journal de Conchyliologie 18: 301-304

External links
 MNHN, Paris: syntype

porphyroleuca
Gastropods described in 1870